Bradford Synagogue is a synagogue at 7 Bowland Street in Bradford, West Yorkshire, affiliated with the Movement for Reform Judaism. It adopted its present name in 2018. The synagogue is still used for Shabbat and major festivals although the community is small and has been in decline for some years. Friday night dinners are held as well as a communal seder for Passover.

Architecture 

The synagogue building is Grade II* listed. Architecturally, Bradford is a very rare and well-preserved, small-scale, provincial synagogue built in "Oriental" style. It is perhaps the most notable example in British synagogue architecture of the 19th-century fashion for "Orientalism" – both inside and out.

History 

Bradford, the third Reform synagogue to be established in the United Kingdom,
is the second oldest surviving Reform synagogue in the UK and its establishment predated the building of an Orthodox synagogue in the town.
The foundation stone was laid in 1880 and the community was founded by one of the first Reform rabbis in Britain, Rabbi Dr. Joseph Strauss. Construction was completed in 1881.

Aged 28 and with a Rabbinic diploma, he was appointed as the first Rabbi in Bradford in 1873, being welcomed by the community at a general meeting on 31 October of that year. Rabbi Strauss led the community from 1873 to 1922.

The decline of the local Jewish community meant that the synagogue faced financial difficulties and a meeting was held in June 2009 where the community agreed to the sale of its building as “a very last resort”.
Subsequent to this meeting funding was secured that enabled the community to continue using the current building.
This was supported by the local Muslim community.

Notable people 

German-born Jews played an important role in the development of the local woollen trade and Jewish merchants from central Europe took advantage of the climate of economic and political freedom in Bradford.

Jacob Moser (1839–1922), born in Denmark, was a founder of the Reform congregation and ardent early Zionist, and became mayor of Bradford.
He was a member of the Zionist Central Council, the Anglo-Palestinian Corporation and supported the Jewish National Fund, giving 50,000 francs to help found the first Hebrew High School in Jaffa in 1907.
He also supported the large and poor Jewish community in Leeds.
Moser was one of the founders of the Bradford Charity Organisation Society and the City Guild of Help.
He served on the board of the British Royal Infirmary from 1883 and contributed £5,000 to the local fund for the building of a new institution.
He provided £10,000 in 1898 as a benevolent fund for the aged and infirm of the city; he also supported the local children’s hospital, donated 12,000 books to Bradford Central Library and was involved in Bradford Technical College, the Workers' Educational Association and the Bradford Scientific Association.

See also 

 List of Jewish communities in the United Kingdom
 Movement for Reform Judaism

References

External links 

 Bradford Reform Synagogue website
 The Movement for Reform Judaism
 British Listed Buildings

1880 establishments in England
Buildings and structures in Bradford
German-Jewish culture in the United Kingdom
Grade II* listed buildings in West Yorkshire
Grade II* listed religious buildings and structures
Manningham, Bradford
Moorish Revival architecture in the United Kingdom
Moorish Revival synagogues
Reform synagogues in the United Kingdom
Religious buildings and structures in West Yorkshire
Synagogues completed in 1881
Synagogues in England